The 1976 Major League Baseball postseason was the playoff tournament of Major League Baseball for the 1976 season. The winners of each division advance to the postseason and face each other in a League Championship Series to determine the pennant winners that face each other in the World Series. 

This edition of the postseason featured new teams - In the American League, the Kansas City Royals made their first postseason appearance in franchise history, and the New York Yankees returned to the postseason for the first time since the 1964 World Series. In the National League, the Philadelphia Phillies made their first postseason appearance since the 1950 World Series, and the Cincinnati Reds returned for the fifth time in the past seven seasons. This was the first of three consecutive postseasons to feature the Royals, Yankees, and Phillies, and they would also appear in the postseason in 1980 and 1981.

The playoffs began on October 9, 1976, and concluded on October 21, 1976, with the Cincinnati Reds sweeping the New York Yankees in the 1976 World Series. It was the fourth title for the Reds overall, and the Reds became the sixth franchise in MLB history to repeat as World Series champions. The Reds became the first team (and as of 2023, the only team) to go undefeated in the postseason in the divisional era.

Playoff seeds
The following teams qualified for the postseason:

American League
 New York Yankees - 97–62, Clinched AL East
 Kansas City Royals - 90–72, Clinched AL West

National League
 Philadelphia Phillies - 101–61, Clinched NL East
 Cincinnati Reds - 102–60, Clinched NL West

Playoff bracket

American League Championship Series

New York Yankees vs. Kansas City Royals

This was the first postseason meeting between the Yankees and Royals. The Yankees defeated the Royals in a back-and-forth five game series, capped off by Chris Chambliss' famous walk-off home run in Game 5. 

In Kansas City, the Yankees stole Game 1 on the road thanks to a complete game performance from Catfish Hunter. In Game 2, the Royals, thanks to excellent relief pitching from Paul Splittorff, as well as five errors committed by the Yankees, evened the series headed to the Bronx. In Game 3, the Royals jumped out to an early 3-0 lead after the first inning, but the Yankees rallied with five unanswered runs in the fourth and sixth innings respectively to win by a 5-3 score and go up 2-1 in the series. The Royals jumped out to an early lead in Game 4 and did not relinquish it, as they won 7-4 and forced a fifth game. Game 5 remained tied at six runs each until the bottom of the ninth inning, when Chris Chambliss won the pennant for the Yankees with a walk-off home run.

The Yankees and Royals would face each other again in three of the next four ALCS', with the Yankees winning again in 1977 and 1978, and the Royals finally pulling through in 1980.

National League Championship Series

Cincinnati Reds vs. Philadelphia Phillies

This was the first postseason meeting between the Reds and Phillies. The defending World Series champion Reds swept the Phillies to advance to their fourth World Series in seven years.

The Reds stole Game 1 on the road thanks to excellent pitching from starter Don Gullett and closer Rawly Eastwick. In Game 2, the Phillies jumped out to a 2-0 lead after five innings, but the Reds scored six unanswered runs in the sixth and seventh innings respectively to won by a 6-2 score and go up 2-0 headed home to Cincinnati. Game 3 was an offensive duel - the Phillies jumped out to a 3-0 lead after the top of the seventh, but the Reds took the lead with four runs scored in the bottom of the inning. The Phillies regained the lead with two runs scored in the top of the eighth, and scored once more in the top of the ninth to go up 6-4. However, the Reds would eventually tie the game, and then won off an RBI single from Ken Griffey, securing the pennant. 

This was the first of three consecutive losses in the NLCS for the Phillies - in 1977 and 1978 the Phillies would lose the NL pennant to the Los Angeles Dodgers both times. They would finally win the NL pennant in 1980 over the Houston Astros in five games. 

Both the Reds and Phillies would meet again in the 2010 NLDS, where the Phillies returned the favor and swept the Reds. This was the last time the Reds won the NL pennant until 1990, where they defeated the Pittsburgh Pirates en route to a World Series title.

1976 World Series

New York Yankees (AL) vs. Cincinnati Reds (NL) 

†: postponed from October 20 due to rain

This was the third World Series matchup between the Reds and Yankees. The other two times were in 1939 and 1961, which the Yankees both won. However, this time history would not repeat itself, as the Reds handily swept the Yankees to repeat as World Series champions, completing a perfect 7-0 run through the postseason.

The series was not close - the Reds convincingly took Game 1 off of excellent pitching from Don Gullett and closer Pedro Borbon. In Game 2, Catfish Hunter pitched a complete game for the Yankees as the game remained tied at three going into the bottom of the ninth, but it wasn't enough. The Reds prevailed as Tony Pérez drove Ken Griffey home with an RBI single, going up 2-0 in the series headed to the Bronx. In Game 3, the Reds jumped out to an early lead and did not relinquish it, winning by a 6-2 score to go up 3-0 in the series. The Yankees would take their only lead of the series in Game 4 by jumping ahead 1-0 after the first, but they were once again no match for the Reds' offense, as they blew out the Yankees in front of their home fans to complete the sweep and secure the title. As of 2023, this is the last time that the Yankees were swept in the World Series.

The Reds' 7-0 run through the postseason stood as an MLB record for 38 years, which was matched by the 2007 Colorado Rockies before they were swept in the World Series, and was broken by the 2014 Kansas City Royals who went 8-0 through the AL Wild Card, ALDS and ALCS before they lost in the World Series.

The Yankees, however, would return to the World Series in 1977 and 1978, defeating the Los Angeles Dodgers both times. The Reds would return to the postseason three years later, but they would be swept by the Pittsburgh Pirates in the NLCS. They would not return to the World Series again until 1990, where they swept the Oakland Athletics.

References

External links
 League Baseball Standings & Expanded Standings - 1976

 
Major League Baseball postseason